Patricia Black, also known as smiler or Patricia Black-Donnelly (28 November 1972 – 15 November 1991) was a Volunteer in the Belfast Brigade of the Provisional Irish Republican Army (IRA).

Background
Black grew up in the Lenadoon area of Belfast and was educated at St. Oliver Plunkett Primary School and St. Genevieve's Girls Secondary School in Belfast.

Active service
Patricia joined the IRA at the age of 17. Her comrades considered her a determined and dedicated young woman and she was tasked with the role of intelligence gathering. Later Black informed her parent that she was moving to Dublin but secretly moved to London.

She died, along with fellow Volunteer, Frank Ryan, on 15 November 1991, when an improvised explosive device she was carrying detonated prematurely in St Albans, near London. A British Army military band had been playing in theatre on St Peter's Street which the pair had planned to attack, when the device unexpectedly exploded killing her and Ryan.

At the funeral of Frank Ryan a Sinn Féin leader, Jim Gibney, stated "Frankie and Patricia are not alone. They are representatives of a generation of Ireland's youth who have acquired the skills to remain hidden, who come forward when required to do so. How will the British defeat this invisible force?"

Black is buried in Milltown Cemetery Belfast.

The Volunteers Patricia Black and Frankie Ryan Memorial Flute Band from the Garngad area of Glasgow is jointly named after her, they are politically aligned to éirígí.

A political mural depicting a uniformed armed female republican in uniform in the Lenadoon area of Belfast is jointly dedicated to Black as well as Laura Crawford, Bridie Quinn and Mairéad Farrell.

A memorial to Black and Ryan was erected in their honour at the Sally Gardens Centre in Belfast. At its unveiling in 2007, West Belfast MLA Jennifer McCann stated "They are our heroes and our inspiration. They are no longer with us but let us take their vision forward."

A memorial ceremony on the 25th anniversary of Patricia Black's death faced criticism when images of children wearing "paramilitary regalia" were circulated in the media.

References

1972 births
1991 deaths
Deaths by improvised explosive device in England
Paramilitaries from Belfast
People killed during The Troubles (Northern Ireland)
Provisional Irish Republican Army members